The 2012–13 North American winter started out somewhat early, as the remnants of Hurricane Sandy brought heavy snow to the mountains of West Virginia in late October. Later, a strong nor'easter affected the weary Northeastern United States, hampering storm recovery efforts and dropping several inches of snow. The rest of the winter featured several other notable events, such as a Christmas winter storm that affected most of the Eastern United States, and the most notable event occurring in early February, when a powerful blizzard struck the Northeast and brought record snow to some areas. During the winter, a weak El Nino was expected to influence weather conditions across the continent.

While there is no well-agreed-upon date used to indicate the start of winter in the Northern Hemisphere, there are two definitions of winter which may be used. Based on the astronomical definition, winter begins at the winter solstice, which in 2012 occurred late on December 21, and ends at the March equinox, which in 2013 occurred on March 20. Based on the meteorological definition, the first day of winter is December 1 and the last day February 28. Both definitions involve a period of approximately three months, with some variability.


Seasonal forecasts 

On October 18, 2012, the National Oceanic and Atmospheric Administration's Climate Prediction Center issued its U.S. Winter Outlook. In the outlook, little rainfall was anticipated in the Northwestern United States and the Upper Midwest, while above-average precipitation was anticipated in the Southeastern United States. Equal levels of precipitation and temperatures were expected in the Alaskan panhandle. Below-average temperatures were favored in Florida, while above-average temperatures were favored in much of the Western United States, and northern Alaska. The remainder of the country fell into the outlook's "equal chance" category, with an equal chance of above-average, below-average, and near-average temperatures and/or precipitation.

Events

Hurricane Sandy 

On October 29, 2012, Hurricane Sandy made landfall in southern New Jersey as an  Category 1 post-tropical cyclone. While initially bringing historic storm surge, damaging winds and heavy rainfall, due the cold air nearby in Canada, the cyclone (dubbed a 'super'storm by many news outlets and sources) was able to produce snow in its massive circulation. This set an October record for most snowfall at Mount LeConte.

Meteorologists assume the reason why Sandy was able to produce such a snowstorm was due to a blast of arctic air – associated with the polar vortex – that had plunged into the Northeast, which led to Sandy actually maintaining its intensity while subsequently deepening before landfall. About a week later, the same areas affected by Sandy were impacted by an early season nor'easter, further hindering recovery efforts in those areas.

Early November nor'easter 

Less than a week after Hurricane Sandy impacted the Northeastern United States, the same areas affected by the cyclone experienced an early season snowstorm on November 7–8. Development began when an area of low pressure formed in the Central United States on November 5. Moving eastward, the disturbance moved off the coast late on November 6, and began to take a more northernly track, slowly strengthening as it did so. Early on November 7, rainbands began affecting the New York metropolitan area, however, due to the cold air that was in place over Canada near the U.S–Canada border, snow began to break out on the storm's western side, directly over the state of New Jersey. Snowfall rates approached  in some areas. Coastal flooding was also a threat, in nearly the same areas that were devastated by coastal flooding from Sandy.

Mid-December blizzard 

On December 17, an upper-level shortwave and associated trough made landfall along the coast of the Pacific Northwest. The system initially moved towards the southeast, strengthening over the Rocky Mountains. This led to the development and formation of a surface low over eastern Colorado early on December 19. The low began to curve towards the northeast, and its barometric pressure began to deepen. The low attained its lowest pressure at 1800 UTC on December 20 over northern Illinois. However, the system became occluded, and as such moved quickly to the northeast, where it weakened and subsequently dissipated over southern Ontario late on December 21. Another low pressure area formed in the vicinity of the previous low over the East Coast of the United States, which quickly moved north across the coast, bringing heavy snowfalls to the region. The low later exited the continental United States on December 22. During the next several days, the winter storm drifted northeastward, and eventually to the south of Greenland, before finally being absorbed by another more powerful extratropical cyclone just south of Iceland, on December 29.

Christmas Day storm complex and tornado outbreak 

On Christmas Day, one of the largest Christmas tornado outbreaks occurred. A large line of thunderstorms suddenly erupted in eastern Texas early on December 25, with a few immediately becoming supercells. Tornadoes began to develop, causing damage to areas in Louisiana, Mississippi, all the way to the Outer Banks (threat began to decline as the squall line approached the area), with at least three being EF3s (one was a long-tracked tornado), and eight being EF2s. Other tornadoes were reported through December 25–26, causing up to more than US$1 million in damages. The system moved out by December 29, as another winter storm began to affect the Northeast.

Early February blizzard 

A major blizzard affected much of the Northeast on February 8–9. Originating from the merger of two areas of low pressure, with the latter being the dominant low of the storm, it moved up the East Coast, and when just offshore of New Jersey, an intense band of precipitation formed. The system continued to produce heavy snow and wind before finally moving away from the coast late on February 9. The storm also received names such as Winter Storm Nemo, Blizzard of 2013, or just simply Blizzard 2013.

Late February winter storm 
On February 19, 2013, an extratropical disturbance developed in the Gulf of Alaska. Within the next few days, the system rapidly intensified, before attaining a minimum low pressure of 984 millibars on February 22. It was already affecting the Pacific Northwest, and because it was also forecasted to cause a lot more damage in the U.S. within the next week. After moving ashore in British Columbia, the storm weakened and shrunk considerably in size as it moved southeastwards into the southern Plains. On February 25, the storm began absorbing moisture coming from the Gulf of Mexico, and began to reintensify. The storm quickly became a blizzard, and leveled out at 994 millibars. Its southern severe side spawned severe thunderstorms and several tornadoes on February 25. The storm began dumping ice in some parts of the Midwest beginning on February 25. The system rapidly grew in size and continued to organize, before beginning to weaken later on February 26. Late on February 26, the blizzard began interacting with a much smaller storm to the west, which added extra moisture to the winter storm. The powerful blizzard turned northeastwards towards the Great Lakes region, and continued dumping snow across areas already impacted by another winter storm the week before. On February 27, the storm absorbed the smaller storm to the west. At the same time, the storm spawned a secondary low along its frontal boundary, over the Southeastern United States. The new storm intensified to 991 mbars as it moved off the coast of New England, while the winter storm's main low pressure area became a 1000-mbar cut-off low over the Great Lakes, while continuing to steadily weaken. Despite this, the blizzard continued producing powerful winds, and dumping large amounts of snow and ice. A maximum wind gust of 91 mph was reported in Cedar Key, Florida. The storm complex also spawned a waterspout over downtown Tampa, Florida, which came ashore as an EF0 tornado. The storm systems continued dumping large amounts of snow, icy mix, and rain across most of the Eastern United States, while slowly moving eastward. The snowfall totals from the winter storm (maximum was ) combined with the previous winter storm greatly exceeded the snowfall totals of 2012, with many states in the Great Plains receiving record amounts of snow. On February 28, the winter storm shrunk in size and developed two smaller circulations within the storm, as it continued weakening. It moved over New England and lost much of its moisture, as it continued moving towards the northeast. It absorbed the smaller secondary ciruculations, while the main secondary low moved out into the Atlantic Ocean. Over the next few days, the winter storm stalled over Nova Scotia, and rapidly weakened into a weak winter storm, while bringing snow showers to the northeast. The storm became a mostly rain system on March 4, but slightly restrengthened, and developed a few smaller circulations. Later, the storm slowly began to weaken again. On March 5, the storm moved out to sea, with a few lingering rain and snow showers in the northeast. On March 5, the system rapidly moved northeastward, and on March 6, it was later absorbed by a larger extratropical system to the east of Europe. Due to the system, a 400-mile stretch of Interstate 40 between Sayre, Oklahoma and Albuquerque, New Mexico was closed for two days due to whiteout conditions, leaving hundreds of trucks stranded on either end of the closure.

Early March nor'easter 

In early March, a winter storm formed in the Upper Midwest and began to move to the south-southeast. This system was sort of a hybrid Alberta clipper, in the way it had more moisture then a usual clipper has. Moving now to the east, it began to approach the Northeast. The snow was hanging back on the western end of the storm, making it look like the system was being stretched out. Rain began to move into the Mid-Atlantic late on March 5, quickly switching over to snow near Washington, D.C. The winter storm continued to move to the east towards the coastline, with the western edge of the snow back in Indiana dissipating. Snow began to condense into snowbands as the system moved off the East Coast near Virginia and began to transition to a nor'easter. The system continued to move northeastward, dropping light snow accumulations before slowing down and stalling for a day. During this time period, the system absorbed a weak disturbance to the west that was approaching it, resulting in more moisture being added to the system. This sudden addition of moisture resulted in a blossom of snow developing from Vermont to southern New Jersey. With this, snowfall totals were much higher than anticipated.

Late March storm complex 
A winter storm affected much of the country after the beginning of spring, starting the night of March 18, and left the east coast on March 24.
The Green and White Mountains and Allagash of Maine will pick up over a foot of snow. The New York City Department of Sanitation issued a snow alert for March 18 starting at 1:00 PM.

Some schools in upstate New York, Massachusetts, New Jersey and Connecticut were closed or delayed opening.  Massachusetts officials postponed the English composition section of its standardized state test until March 25. FlightAware recorded nearly 400 flight cancellations across the United States on March 18. Snow totals as of the morning of March 19 are: 4" in Manchester, Connecticut; 4.5" in Ludlow, Massachusetts; 5.2" in South Weymouth, Massachusetts; 5.3" in Fitchburg, Massachusetts; and 8.0" in Brookline, Massachusetts. The World Trade Center (PATH station) closed briefly during the evening of March 18, because of falling ice from 1 World Trade Center. As of late March 19, five inches of snow was recorded southwest of Erie, Pennsylvania and East Hampstead, New Hampshire reported 15 inches.

At least one person was killed in Queens, New York, and seven were injured on March 18, all due to vehicle-related accidents.

See also 

 Great Arctic Cyclone of 2012

References

External links 
 2012 Storm Summaries from the Weather Prediction Center
 2013 Storm Summaries from the Weather Prediction Center
Major Winter Weather Events during the 2012–2013 Cold Season (WPC)

 
2012 meteorology
2013 meteorology
North American winters
Winter
Winter